Hobart Sherwood Billingsley (December 2, 1926 – July 16, 2022) was an American diving champion who later coached high school, college, and olympic diving teams for several decades. He was an honoree of the International Swimming Hall of Fame.

Early life
Billingsley was born to Wenonah (Willing) Billingsley and James in Erie, Pennsylvania, on December 2, 1926. He taught himself how to dive by analyzing wallcharts at his local YMCA. During his final year of high school in 1943, he finished in third place at the national championships. He then studied at Ohio State University (OSU), where he won the NCAA one-and three-meter titles during his freshman year in 1945. After putting his studies on hold to enlist in the United States Armed Forces, Billingsley served in Japan during World War II before going back to OSU. He subsequently undertook postgraduate studies at the University of Washington and obtained a master's degree.

Career
Billingsley first worked as a high school teacher and coach. He was the swimming and diving coach at Allen Park High School in Wayne County, Michigan from 1955 to 1957, where he molded the beginnings of a swimming program that led to Allen Park eventually capturing the Michigan High School Boys State Championship. He was subsequently recruited by James Counsilman, the head swimming coach at Indiana University who created the position of diving coach especially for Billingsley.

Billingsley served as the Indiana Hoosiers’s diving coach from 1959 to 1989. During these three decades, he led the Hoosiers to six NCAA and 23 Big Ten team championships. He also coached the United States Olympic diving team at the 1968, 1972, and 1976 Summer Games. Divers under his tutelage won 115 national diving titles and seven Olympic medals. His Olympic gold and bronze medalists include Lesley Bush, Kenneth Sitzberger, Mark Lenzi (twice), Cynthia Potter, Win Young, and Jim Henry. Billingsley later established the World Diving Coaches Association in 1968 and the American Coaches Diving Association two years later. He was regarded as one of the most influential figures in the history of diving. He was profiled in the award-winning and widely televised documentary Hobie’s Heroes — 25th Anniversary Edition, which depicts the struggles and successes of young divers training under this legendary coach. The title was derived from the nickname he gave to his divers.

Later life
Following retirement from university coaching, Billingsley continued to be active in the sport, training divers and coaches around the world, and was respected as a speaker on diving history, technique and ethics, and on sports in general. His book Diving Illustrated, a seminal work offering detailed technical support for coaching diving, was released in 1990, with the second edition being published in 2018.

Personal life
Billingsley married Mary Drake in 1952. They met in college, and had three children together.

Billingsley was diagnosed with myasthenia gravis in July 2018 and hospitalized. He died on July 16, 2022, in Bloomington, at age 95.

Honors and awards
Billingsley was inducted into the International Swimming Hall of Fame in 1983. He was given the Sammy Lee Award, the most esteemed award in diving, in 1994. That same year, he was enshrined in the Indiana University Athletics Hall of Fame. At the 1996 Atlanta Summer Olympics, he took the oath on behalf of all judges. The Counsilman–Billingsley Aquatics Center at Indiana University is named in his honor, as is an award bestowed by the Indiana High School Swimming and Diving Hall of Fame.

See also
 List of members of the International Swimming Hall of Fame

References

External links 
 

1926 births
2022 deaths
American diving coaches
American male divers
American referees and umpires
Indiana Hoosiers diving coaches
Oath takers at the Olympic Games
Olympic officials
Sportspeople from Erie, Pennsylvania